The year 1572 in science and technology included many events, some of which are listed here.

Astronomy
 November 9 – A supernova, now designated as SN 1572, is first observed in the constellation Cassiopeia by Cornelius Gemma. Tycho Brahe, who notes it two days later, will use it to challenge the prevailing view that stars do not change.

Cartography
 Georg Braun begins publication of his urban atlas  in Cologne.

Mathematics
 Imaginary numbers defined by Rafael Bombelli.

Medicine
 Girolamo Mercuriale of Forlì (Italy) writes the work  ("On the diseases of the skin"), the first scientific tract on dermatology.

Technology
 Mathew Baker appointed Master Shipwright to Queen Elizabeth I of England.

Births
 November 25 - Daniel Sennert, German physician (died 1637) 
 Johann Bayer, German uranographer (died 1625)
 Charles Bouvard, French herbalist (died 1658)
 Cornelius Drebbel, Dutch inventor (died 1634)
 Bartholomew Gosnold, English explorer and privateer (died 1607)

Deaths
 August 26 (St. Bartholomew's Day massacre) – Petrus Ramus, French logician (born 1515)
 December 12 – Loredana Marcello, Venetian dogaressa and botanist.

References

 
16th century in science
1570s in science